Fran Bradač (June 15, 1885 – May 2, 1970) was a Slovene classical philologist and translator.

Life and work
Bradač was born in Jama pri Dvoru. He studied classical philology in Vienna from 1905 to 1910, and then continued his education in Zagreb, where he received his doctorate in 1920, followed by further study in Prague and Berlin. He taught classical philology at the University of Ljubljana's Faculty of Arts from 1923 until 1945, when he was forced to retire by the new communist regime. Together with Josip Osana, he published the only grammar of Greek in Slovene to date. He also wrote a Greek textbook, compiled a dictionary of foreign vocabulary, and authored several dictionaries of Czech, Latin, and German. He translated a number of important Classical poems and comedies into Slovene, and he also translated material from modern languages, including Czech (Jaroslav Hašek and Karel Čapek) and German (Heinrich Mann, Erich Kästner, and others).

Bibliography
 Slovar tujk (Dictionary of Foreign Vocabulary)
 Slovensko-latinski slovar (Slovene-Latin Dictionary)
 O goskici, ki se je učila peti (The Gosling That Learned to Sing), translation of a work by Karel Hroch 
 Izbrane pesmi rimskih lirikov Katula, Tibula in Propercija: tekst in komentar (Selected Poems from the Roman Lyrics of Catullus, Tibullus, and Propertius: Text and Commentary)

References

External links
Grave of Fran Bradač at Žale Cemetery

1885 births
1970 deaths
Slovenian philologists
Slovenian translators
Academic staff of the University of Ljubljana
20th-century translators
Philologists from Yugoslavia